Bryx dunckeri (pugnose pipefish) is a species of pipefish of the family Syngnathidae. It is found in the western Atlantic Ocean, from North Carolina to Florida and the Bahamas, in the Gulf of Mexico, and off South America to Macau, Brazil. It inhabits shallow waters above algae and rock, both in estuaries and seagrass beds. This species is ovoviviparous, with the males carrying eggs until they are ready to hatch.

References

Further reading
World Register of Marine Species
Discover Life
ITIS Report

dunckeri
Marine fish
Taxa named by Jan Marie Metzelaar
Fish described in 1919